John Harpeden may refer to:

John Harpeden I ([fl. 1371–1389), seneschal of Saintonge and Aquitaine
John Harpeden II (fl. 1372–1415), French courtier
John Harpeden (died 1438), English knight